The Third Street Bridge, officially known as the David Morgan Memorial Bridge, is a span that crosses the Monongahela River, in Fairmont, West Virginia. The bridge has a characteristic curve in it, and was built in 1979 in order to relieve some of the traffic from the Robert H. Mollohan-Jefferson Street Bridge after the Low Level Bridge had closed.

References

See also
List of crossings of the Monongahela River

Buildings and structures in Marion County, West Virginia
Transportation in Marion County, West Virginia
Road bridges in West Virginia
Bridges over the Monongahela River
Steel bridges in the United States
Girder bridges in the United States